Speak of the Dead is the 18th studio album by German heavy metal band Rage, released in 2006 by Nuclear Blast. The album contains a mix of different music genres, adding symphonic and progressive influences to their usual fast power metal/melodic thrash metal. The band go back to the album Lingua Mortis themes and atmospheres in the suite that opens the album, called "Suite Lingua Mortis" that consists in eight parts, using a full symphonic orchestra recorded in Minsk, Belarus. The album marked the last featuring drummer Mike Terrana.

Track listing

Personnel

Band members 
Peter "Peavy" Wagner – vocals, bass
Victor Smolski – guitars, piano, keyboards, cello, orchestral arrangements
Mike Terrana – drums and percussion

Additional musicians 
Inspector Symphonic Orchestra conducted by Andrey Zubrich
Thomas Hackmann – backing vocals

Production 
Ingo 'Charly' Czajkowski – producer, engineer
Charlie Bauerfeind – mixing, mastering
Jan Rubach – additional digital editing

References 

Rage (German band) albums
2006 albums
Nuclear Blast albums
Symphonic metal albums by German artists
Thrash metal albums by German artists